This is a list of cricket grounds in Zimbabwe.  The grounds included in this list have held first-class, List-A and Twenty20 matches.  Additionally, some of the first-class and List-A matches have come in the form of Test matches and One Day Internationals.

International Grounds
Listed in order of date first used for Test or ODI  match.

Non-International grounds

Proposed venue
Listed in order of proposed venue for Test and ODI  match.

References

External links
Cricket grounds in Zimbabwe at CricketArchive.

Zimbabwe
Cricket grounds
Grounds